Gordon Smith is a New Zealand former rugby league footballer who represented New Zealand.

Playing career
From the Waro-rakau club in the West Coast Rugby League competition, Smith represented both the West Coast and the South Island before being selected to play for the New Zealand national rugby league team in 1979. Smith would play in 14 Test matches between 1979 and 1983.

In 1982 Smith signed with Hull Kingston Rovers in the English competition and remained with the club until 1988, scoring 80 points for the club.

Gordon Smith was a First Division Championship winner with Hull Kingston Rovers in the  1983-84 season and the  1984-85 season

Gordon Smith was an interchange/substitute, i.e. number 14, in Hull Kingston Rovers' 14–15 defeat by Castleford in the 1984 Challenge Cup Final during the 1984–85 season at Wembley Stadium, London, on Saturday 3 May 1986, in front of a crowd of 82,134.

Gordon Smith played  in Hull Kingston Rovers' 22-18 victory over Castleford in the 1985 Yorkshire County Cup Final during the 1985–86 season at Headingley Rugby Stadium, Leeds on Sunday 27 October 1985.

Gordon Smith played  in Hull Kingston Rovers' 8-11 defeat by Wigan in the 1985–86 John Player Special Trophy Final during the 1985–86 season at Elland Road, Leeds on Saturday 11 January 1986.

Smith rejoined Waro-rakau in the West Coast competition before moving to the Canterbury Rugby League in 1990, becoming the player-coach of Halswell.

References

Living people
Halswell Hornets players
Hull Kingston Rovers players
New Zealand national rugby league team players
New Zealand rugby league coaches
New Zealand rugby league players
Rugby league halfbacks
South Island rugby league team players
Waro-rakau players
West Coast rugby league team players
Year of birth missing (living people)